The Robert Fulton Birthplace is a historic house museum at 1932 Robert Fulton Highway (U.S. Route 222) south of Quarryville, Pennsylvania. Built in the mid-18th century and reconstructed after a fire demolished it in 1822, it was the birthplace of inventor Robert Fulton (1765–1815). Fulton is best known for the development of commercially viable steamboats as a means of transportation. The house was declared a National Historic Landmark in 1964. The property is owned by the Southern Lancaster Historical Society which gives weekend tours of the house from Memorial Day through Labor Day.

Description and history
The house is a -story stone structure, built out of mortared rubblestone that was once covered in stucco. Its front facade is three bays wide, with the main entrance in the right bay, in a recess with a four-light transom window. There are two windows to its left, and two windows on the second floor above. The interior has a parlor, kitchen, and bedroom on the ground floor, with three more bedrooms in the second floor and attic.

The house in which Robert Fulton was born was probably built in the mid-18th century. He was born here in 1765, but the family moved soon thereafter to Lancaster. The house was reduced to rubble by a fire in 1822, and was completely rebuilt. It remained a private residence until it was acquired by the state in 1969. It was then given a complete restoration to return it to its original appearance at the time of Fulton's birth, and has been open as a museum property since.

Fulton's development of a viable steamship, the North River Steamboat or "Clermont", in 1807, is widely regarded as introducing a transportation revolution into early 19th-century America. It was not the only invention of Fulton's that was significant: he also developed dredging equipment for use in rivers and canals, invented a system of inclined planes for transporting canal barges over hills, and developed early versions of torpedoes and diving boats.

Gallery

See also
 List of National Historic Landmarks in Pennsylvania
 National Register of Historic Places listings in Lancaster County, Pennsylvania

References

External links

 Southern Lancaster Historical Society
 Visit Lancaster - Robert Fulton Birthplace

National Historic Landmarks in Pennsylvania
Museums in Lancaster County, Pennsylvania
Houses on the National Register of Historic Places in Pennsylvania
Houses completed in 1750
Historic house museums in Pennsylvania
Biographical museums in Pennsylvania
Houses in Lancaster County, Pennsylvania
Birthplaces of individual people
National Register of Historic Places in Lancaster County, Pennsylvania